The Tom Wilhelmsen Opera and Ballet Prize is the main opera and ballet prize of Norway, awarded by the philanthropic Tom Wilhelmsen's Foundation  (Tom Wilhelmsens Stiftelse) in honour of shipping magnate Tom Wilhelmsen (1911-1978)   through a donation from the billionaire Wilhelmsen family, owners of Norway's largest shipping company Wilh. Wilhelmsen. It includes an annual monetary prize of over 50,000 euro.

Laureates
2009:  and Eli Kristin Hansveen
2010: 
2011: Marita Kvarving Sølvberg 
2012: Yngve Søberg and Eugenie Skilnand
2013: Audun Iversen and Camilla Spidsøe Cohen
2014: Yolander Correa
2015: Ingeborg Gillebo 
2016: Operaorkestret 
2017: Melissa Hough and Adrian Angelico
2018: John Lidal and Alan Lucien Øyen 
2019: Grete Sofie Borud Nybakken

References

Classical music awards
Opera competitions